Interferon-stimulated gene 15 (ISG15) is a 17 kDA secreted protein that in humans is encoded by the ISG15 gene. ISG15 is induced by  type I interferon (IFN) and serves many functions, acting both as an extracellular cytokine and an intracellular protein modifier. The precise functions are diverse and vary among species but include potentiation of Interferon gamma (IFN-II) production in lymphocytes, ubiquitin-like conjugation to newly-synthesized proteins and negative regulation of the IFN-I response.

Structure 
The ISG15 gene consists of two exons and encodes for a 17 kDa polypeptide. The immature polypeptide is cleaved at its carboxy terminus, generating a mature 15 kDa product that terminates with a LRLRGG  motif, as found in ubiquitin. The tertiary structure of ISG15 also resembles ubiquitin, despite only ~30% sequence homology. Specifically, this structure consists of two ubiquitin-like domains connected by a polypeptide ‘hinge.’ Of note, ISG15 shows substantial sequence variation among species, with homology as low as 30% between  orthologs.

Function 
After induction by  type I interferon, ISG15 can be found in three forms, each with unique functions:

Extracellular cytokine
ISG15 is secreted from the cell and can be detected in supernatant or blood plasma. ISG15 binds the LFA-1 integrin receptor on NK- and T-cells to potentiate their production of IFN-II, which is essential for  mycobacterial immunity.

Intracellular conjugate: ISGylation
In a ubiquitin-like fashion, ISG15 is covalently linked by its C-terminal LRLRGG motif to lysine residues on newly synthesized proteins. This process, termed ISGylation, is catalyzed by a series of conjugating enzymes. The activating E1 enzyme (UBE1L) charges ISG15 by forming a high-energy thiolester intermediate and transfers it to the UbcH8 E2 enzyme. UbcH8 has been identified as the major E2 for ISGylation, although it also functions in ubiquitination. The E2 protein subsequently transfers the ISG15 to specific E3 ligases (Herc5) and relevant intracellular substrates. Only one deconjugating protease with specificity to ISG15 has been identified to date: USP18 (a member of the USP family) cleaves ISG15-peptide fusions and also removes ISG15 (deISGylation) from native conjugates. The effects of ISGylation are incompletely understood and involve both activation and inhibition of antiviral immunity.

Free intracellular molecule
Unconjugated ISG15 negatively regulates IFN-I signaling by preventing the SKP2-mediated  proteasomal degradation of USP18, a direct inhibitor of the IFN-I receptor. Absence of ISG15 leads to persistent IFN-I signaling in human, but not mouse, systems.

Clinical significance
ISG15-deficiency is a very rare genetic disorder caused by mutations of the ISG15 gene. It is inherited with an autosomal recessive pattern and is classified as a primary immunodeficiency or inborn error of immunity. Patients present in childhood with infectious, neurologic or  dermatologic features. Basal ganglia calcification is observed in all patients reported to date and represents the underlying autoinflammatory disease of excessive IFN-I activity, known as type I interferonopathy. The basal ganglia calcifications may cause epileptic seizures but often are asymptomatic. The IFN-I inflammation may also manifest early in life as ulcerative skin lesions in the armpit, groin and neck regions. Finally, ISG15-deficiency leads to mendelian susceptibility to mycobacterial disease, although with incomplete penetrance. These infections present as  fistulizing  lymphadenopathies and respiratory symptoms following BCG vaccination. 
In pancreatic ductal adenocarcinoma, tumor-associated macrophages secrete ISG15 enhancing the phenotype of cancer stem cells in the tumor.

History
ISG15 was originally identified in the late 1970s as a 15-kDa protein produced in response to type I interferon, a potent class of antiviral cytokines. Given the molecular weight, it was originally termed ‘a 15-kDa protein’, but later renamed interferon-stimulated-gene-15 when the cassette of interferon-stimulated genes were recognized. In 1987 it was identified that ISG15  cross-reacts with anti-ubiquitin antibodies, and subsequent experiments uncovered the ubiquitin-like conjugation of ISG15 to other cellular proteins, coined ‘ISGylation’. Given its inducibility by IFN-I, studies in the following decades focused on the antiviral activity of ISG15. These studies were carried out predominantly with in vitro systems and mouse models, and ascribed several antiviral functions to ISGylation. During this time, it was also discovered that ISG15 could be detected outside of cells. and in human serum samples. This free form of ISG15 could stimulate IFN-II production in lymphocytes. Finally, ISG15 could also be detected as an un-conjugated intracellular molecule with functions independent of ISGylation.

The discovery of humans deficient in ISG15 elucidated the importance of these functions in human biology. ISG15-deficient patients were first identified by their susceptibly to BCG-strain mycobacteria, owing to the essential function of free ISG15 to potentiate the IFN-gamma / Interleukin-12 axis Surprisingly, despite the IFN-inducible nature of ISG15 and the previously-ascribed antiviral functions in mice, ISG15-deficient patients showed no susceptibility to viral infections. In fact, follow-up studies uncovered enhanced type I IFN signatures, manifesting as basal ganglia calcifications akin to TORCH infection but without an infectious etiology. This persistent, low-level inflammation was later shown to confer enhanced resistance to a wide array of viruses. This phenotype results from a previously-unrecognized function of ISG15 to negatively regulate IFN signaling, which is absent in murine systems. Other higher-order mammals (e.g. pig and dog), however, have achieved this negative regulatory function of ISG15, seemingly by convergent evolution.

References

Further reading

External links